Walter Marvin Knott (December 11, 1889 – December 3, 1981) was an American farmer who created the Knott's Berry Farm amusement park in California, introduced the Boysenberry, and made Knott's Berry Farm boysenberry preserves.

Early life 
On December 11, 1889, Knott was born in San Bernardino, California. Knott's father was Elgin Charles Knott, a reverend originally from Tennessee. Knott's mother was Margaret Virginia Daugherty. Knott grew up in Pomona, California.

Career 
In the 1920s, Knott was a somewhat unsuccessful farmer whose fortunes changed when he nursed several abandoned berry plants back to health. The hybrid boysenberry, named after its creator, Rudolph Boysen, was a cross between a blackberry, red raspberry and loganberry. The huge berries were a hit, and the Knott family sold berries, preserves and pies from a Buena Park, California roadside stand. In 1934, Knott's wife Cordelia (née Hornaday, January 23, 1890 – April 12, 1974) began serving fried chicken dinners, and within a few years, lines outside the restaurant were often several hours long.

To entertain the waiting crowds, Walter built a Ghost Town in 1940, using buildings relocated from Old West towns. In 1940 Walter sent his son Russel to Twentynine Palms, California. Russel was helped by a local resident Daniel F. Leahy who took Russel to the Old Calico Ghost Town in the hills  from Barstow, California. "Very soon after this visit Walter purchased a number of Calico's buildings. They were carefully disassembled, trucked, and reassembled in Buena Park." (see pages 160–161 in For Those Who Served by Michael H. Pazeian). Walt Disney and Walter Knott are rumored to have had a cordial relationship; it is known that they each visited the other's park, and they were both members of the original planning council for Children's Hospital of Orange County. Early additions to the farm included the Ghost Town & Calico Railroad, a narrow gauge railroad in the Ghost Town area, a San Francisco cable car, a Pan-for-Gold attraction, the Calico Mine Train dark ride and the Timber Mountain Log Ride log flume ride. In 1968, the Knott family fenced the farm, charged admission for the first time, and Knott's Berry Farm officially became an amusement park.

Because of his interest in American pioneer history, Knott purchased and restored the real silver mining ghost town of Calico, California in 1951. As a child, Walter spent a lot of time in Calico living with his uncle. During World War I he helped to build a silver mill in Calico. This period in his life influenced his decision to buy the town and restore it. In 1966, he deeded Calico to San Bernardino County, California.

Walter remained active in the operation of Knott's Berry Farm until the death of Cordelia in 1974, at which point he turned his attention toward political causes, leaving day-to-day park operations to his children. He supported conservative Republican causes. He was also a member of the John Birch Society and sponsored its Orange County chapter.

Although Knott was a struggling farmer and businessman during the 1920s and the 1930s Great Depression, he sternly believed in rugged individualism, that anyone could be successful through hard work, and any form of government intervention was wrong. Some say this 'Old West' theme of his amusement park was a romantic and one-sided reflection of his beliefs.  Knott was active in a variety of conservative causes, including founding the California Free Enterprise Assistance and endowed various private schools and colleges.  Knott ultimately developed a friendship with Ronald Reagan.

Knott appeared on the December 23, 1954 episode of You Bet Your Life, hosted by Groucho Marx.

The Knott family no longer owns the theme park; it was sold to the Cedar Fair Entertainment Company. Additionally, The J.M. Smucker Co. now owns the "Knott's Berry Farm" brand of jam and jelly (purchased from ConAgra Foods in 2008).

Personal life 
Knott's wife was Cordelia Knott. They had four children, Virginia, Russell, Rachel, and Marion. On April 12, 1974, Knott's wife died in Buena Park, California.

On December 3, 1981, just 8 days shy of his 92nd birthday, Knott died from Parkinson's disease in his home in Buena Park, California. He was 91 years old. Knott is buried at Loma Vista Memorial Park in Fullerton, California.

References

External links 

 
 Official Knott's Berry Farm Site
 Official Knott's Halloween Haunt Site
 Knott's Berry Farm at britannica.com

Amusement park developers
Farmers from California
1889 births
1981 deaths
Knott's Berry Farm
People from Buena Park, California
People from San Bernardino, California
John Birch Society members
California Republicans
People from Pomona, California
Conservatism in the United States